Lenin Street is a street in Tsentralny and Zheleznodorozhny districts of Novosibirsk, Russia. It starts from Krasny Avenue, runs west, crosses Sovetskaya and Uritsky streets, Street of Revolution, forms a crossroad with Dimitrov Avenue, then turns north-west, crosses Komsomolsky Avenue, 1905 Year Street and forms a crossroads with Dmitry Shamshurin and Zheleznodorozhny streets.

Gallery

Architecture
 Women's Gimnasium of P. A. Smirnova is a building on the corner of Uritsky and Sovetskaya streets. It was built in 1905.
 Main Post Office is a building on the corner of Sovetskaya and Lenin streets. It was built in 1916.
 Pobeda Cinema is a cinema built in 1925.
 House of Textiles is a building on the corner of Sovetskaya and Lenin street. It was built in 1926.
 Univermag is a modernist building on the corner of Chelyuskintsev and Lenin streets. It was built in 1927.
 October Revolution House of Culture is a constructivist building on the corner of Street of Revolution and Lenin Street. It was built in 1928.
 Business House is a constructivist building on the corner of Krasny Avenue and Lenin Street. It was built in 1928.
 Gosbank Building is a constructivist building on the corner of Krasny Avenue and Lenin Street. It was built in 1930.
 Housing estate near Novosibirsk-Glavny Railway Station is a constructivist building complex built in 1928–1933. It was located between Lenin, Chelyuskintsev and Omskaya streets.
 Lenin Street 8 (Sovetskaya Street 35) is a building on the corner of Sovetskaya and Lenin streets. It was built in 1951.

Theatres
 Red Torch Drama Theatre
 Novosibirsk Puppet Theatre

Hotels
 Central Hotel
 Domina Novosibirsk
 Azimut Hotel Sibir
 Hotel Novosibirsk

Organizations

 Sibenergosetproject
 Administration of the Central Okrug
 Novosibirsk State Theater Institute

Transportation

Railway

 Novosibirsk-Glavny

Metro
 Ploshchad Lenina (two entrances to the station are located between Krasny Avenue, Lenin and Ordzhonikidze streets)
 Ploshchad Garina-Mikhaylovskogo.

References

Streets in Novosibirsk
Tsentralny City District, Novosibirsk
Zheleznodorozhny City District, Novosibirsk